The 2022–23 3. Liga is the 30th season of the third-tier football league of Slovakia since its establishment in 1993. Since the 2022–23 season, the league is composed of 32 teams divided into two groups of 16 teams. Teams are divided into two divisions: 3. liga Západ (West) and 3. liga Východ (Eastern), according to geographical separation.

Západ (West)

Východ (Eastern)

Changes 
The following teams have changed division since the 2020–21 season:

To 2. liga 
Relegated from 2. liga
 Námestovo
 Bardejov

Promoted from 4. liga
 TBA
 TBA

From 2. liga 
Promoted to 2. liga
 Tatran Prešov

Relegated to 4. liga
 TBA

Relegated to 5. liga
 TBA (due to financial problems)

League table

See also
 2022–23 Slovak First Football League
 2022–23 2. Liga (Slovakia)
 2022–23 Slovak Cup

References

3. Liga (Slovakia) seasons
3
Slovak Third League